Lata Narayanan (born 1966) is an Indian-Canadian computer scientist whose research concerns distributed algorithms and wireless ad hoc networks. She is a professor and chair of the Department of Computer Science and Software Engineering at Concordia University in Montreal.

Early life and education
Narayanan is originally from Chennai, where she was born in 1966.
She went to high school in New Delhi, and is a 1987 graduate of the Birla Institute of Technology and Science, Pilani, majoring in computer science.

Next, she traveled to the University of Rochester in the US for graduate study in computer science, earning a master's degree in 1989 and completing her Ph.D. in 1992. Her dissertation, Selection, Sorting, and Routing on Mesh-Connected Processor Arrays, was supervised by Danny Krizanc.

Career
After postdoctoral research at the University of Manitoba, Narayanan joined the Concordia University faculty in 1993.

Before taking her current role as department chair, she was associate dean for academic programs in the Concordia University Faculty of Engineering and Computer Science, stepping down in 2012.

References

External links
Home page

1966 births
Living people
Scientists from Chennai
Indian computer scientists
Indian women computer scientists
Canadian computer scientists
Canadian women computer scientists
Birla Institute of Technology and Science, Pilani alumni
University of Rochester alumni
Academic staff of Concordia University